Goria is a surname. Notable people with the surname include:

 Alexandre Goria (1823–1860), French composer
 Gianfranco Goria, Italian cartoonist and journalist
 Giovanni Goria (1943–1994), Italian politician

See also
 Goria (disambiguation)